The 2004–05 Colorado Avalanche season was cancelled due to the lock-out of the players of the National Hockey League. It would have been the 10th playing season since the franchise relocated from Quebec prior to the start of the 1995–96 NHL season. As well as the franchise's 26th season in the National Hockey League and 33rd season overall. The Avalanche would commemorate their 10th anniversary in the 2005-06 season.

Off-season
Joel Quenneville was named the team’s new head coach on July 7, 2004. His predecessor, Tony Granato, remained with the club as an assistant coach.

Schedule
Colorado’s preseason and regular season schedules were announced on July 14, 2004.

|-
| 1 || September 25 || Dallas Stars
|-
| 2 || September 28 || Detroit Red Wings
|-
| 3 || September 30 || @ Dallas Stars
|-
| 4 || October 2 || Los Angeles Kings
|-
| 5 || October 5 || @ Detroit Red Wings
|-
| 6 || October 9 || @ Los Angeles Kings
|-

|-
| 1 || October 13 || Los Angeles Kings
|-
| 2 || October 16 || @ San Jose Sharks
|-
| 3 || October 17 || Boston Bruins
|-
| 4 || October 20 || @ Chicago Blackhawks
|-
| 5 || October 21 || @ Columbus Blue Jackets
|-
| 6 || October 23 || Tampa Bay Lightning
|-
| 7 || October 27 || Phoenix Coyotes
|-
| 8 || October 29 || Calgary Flames
|-
| 9 || October 30 || Vancouver Canucks
|-
| 10 || November 2 || @ Vancouver Canucks
|-
| 11 || November 4 || @ Calgary Flames
|-
| 12 || November 5 || @ Minnesota Wild
|-
| 13 || November 8 || Pittsburgh Penguins
|-
| 14 || November 10 || Vancouver Canucks
|-
| 15 || November 11 || @ St. Louis Blues
|-
| 16 || November 13 || @ Nashville Predators
|-
| 17 || November 16 || Edmonton Oilers
|-
| 18 || November 18 || St. Louis Blues
|-
| 19 || November 20 || Anaheim Mighty Ducks
|-
| 20 || November 22 || Columbus Blue Jackets
|-
| 21 || November 26 || @ Calgary Flames
|-
| 22 || November 27 || @ Edmonton Oilers
|-
| 23 || December 1 || Atlanta Thrashers
|-
| 24 || December 3 || Anaheim Mighty Ducks
|-
| 25 || December 5 || Calgary Flames
|-
| 26 || December 8 || Detroit Red Wings
|-
| 27 || December 10 || Chicago Blackhawks
|-
| 28 || December 11 || @ Nashville Predators
|-
| 29 || December 13 || Florida Panthers
|-
| 30 || December 15 || @ Phoenix Coyotes
|-
| 31 || December 17 || @ Anaheim Mighty Ducks
|-
| 32 || December 18 || @ Los Angeles Kings
|-
| 33 || December 23 || Ottawa Senators
|-
| 34 || December 26 || @ Chicago Blackhawks
|-
| 35 || December 27 || Toronto Maple Leafs
|-
| 36 || December 30 || @ St. Louis Blues
|-
| 37 || December 31 || @ Dallas Stars
|-
| 38 || January 2 || Phoenix Coyotes
|-
| 39 || January 4 || Edmonton Oilers
|-
| 40 || January 6 || Vancouver Canucks
|-
| 41 || January 8 || Detroit Red Wings
|-
| 42 || January 11 || @ New York Islanders
|-
| 43 || January 12 || @ New Jersey Devils
|-
| 44 || January 14 || @ Columbus Blue Jackets
|-
| 45 || January 17 || @ Boston Bruins
|-
| 46 || January 19 || Montreal Canadiens
|-
| 47 || January 22 || San Jose Sharks
|-
| 48 || January 26 || Dallas Stars
|-
| 49 || January 27 || @ Minnesota Wild
|-
| 50 || January 29 || @ Detroit Red Wings
|-
| 51 || January 31 || @ Vancouver Canucks
|-
| 52 || February 1 || @ Edmonton Oilers
|-
| 53 || February 4 || Minnesota Wild
|-
| 54 || February 7 || Carolina Hurricanes
|-
| 55 || February 9 || St. Louis Blues
|-
| 56 || February 16 || @ Dallas Stars
|-
| 57 || February 18 || @ Anaheim Mighty Ducks
|-
| 58 || February 19 || @ Los Angeles Kings
|-
| 59 || February 22 || Minnesota Wild
|-
| 60 || February 24 || @ Washington Capitals
|-
| 61 || February 26 || @ Philadelphia Flyers
|-
| 62 || February 27 || @ New York Rangers
|-
| 63 || March 2 || Nashville Predators
|-
| 64 || March 4 || Dallas Stars
|-
| 65 || March 6 || San Jose Sharks
|-
| 66 || March 10 || @ Carolina Hurricanes
|-
| 67 || March 11 || @ Atlanta Thrashers
|-
| 68 || March 13 || @ Detroit Red Wings
|-
| 69 || March 15 || @ Buffalo Sabres
|-
| 70 || March 17 || Edmonton Oilers
|-
| 71 || March 19 || Calgary Flames
|-
| 72 || March 21 || @ Edmonton Oilers
|-
| 73 || March 22 || @ Vancouver Canucks
|-
| 74 || March 25 || Columbus Blue Jackets
|-
| 75 || March 26 || @ Phoenix Coyotes
|-
| 76 || March 28 || @ San Jose Sharks
|-
| 77 || March 31 || Chicago Blackhawks
|-
| 78 || April 2 || Los Angeles Kings
|-
| 79 || April 4 || @ Minnesota Wild
|-
| 80 || April 6 || Minnesota Wild
|-
| 81 || April 8 || Nashville Predators
|-
| 82 || April 10 || @ Calgary Flames
|-

Transactions
The Avalanche were involved in the following transactions from June 8, 2004, the day after the deciding game of the 2004 Stanley Cup Finals, through February 16, 2005, the day the  season was officially cancelled.

Trades
The Avalanche did not make any trades.

Players acquired

Players lost

Signings

Draft picks
Colorado's picks at the 2004 NHL Entry Draft, which was held at the RBC Center in Raleigh, North Carolina on June 26–27, 2004.

Notes

References

Colorado
Colorado
Colorado Avalanche seasons
Colorado Avalanche
Colorado Avalanche